National Route 477 is a national highway of Japan. The highway connects Yokkaichi, Mie and Ikeda, Osaka.

Route description
A section of the Biwako bridge that carries National Route 477 over Lake Biwa is a musical road.

References

477
Roads in Hyōgo Prefecture
Roads in Kyoto Prefecture
Roads in Mie Prefecture
Roads in Osaka Prefecture
Roads in Shiga Prefecture
Musical roads in Japan